The 2002 FIA Sportscar Championship Barcelona was the first race for the 2002 FIA Sportscar Championship season held at Circuit de Catalunya and ran a distance of two hours, thirty minutes.  It took place on April 7, 2002.

Official results
Class winners in bold.  Cars failing to complete 75% of winner's distance marked as Not Classified (NC).

Statistics
 Pole Position - #16 Pescarolo Sport - 1:35.428
 Fastest Lap - #14 Team Oreca - 1:35.161

References

B
FIA Sportscar